Jerry Mayer is an American playwright, producer and screenwriter. He developed the television series The Facts of Life with Howard Leeds and Ben Starr. Mayer is also the creator of the television series Tabitha. He was nominated for a Primetime Emmy Award in the category Outstanding Writing for Variety Special for his work on the television special Mitzi...Roarin' in the 20's.

References

External links 

Living people
Year of birth missing (living people)
American dramatists and playwrights
American male screenwriters
American television writers
American male television writers
American television producers
20th-century American screenwriters